Jesse Levine and Kei Nishikori were the defending champions. Levine chose to not play and Nishikori was injured.
Jonathan Erlich and Harel Levy became the new champions, after their won against Prakash Amritraj and Rajeev Ram in the final (6–3, 6–3).

Seeds

Draw

Draw

External links
 Doubles Draw

Turk Telecom Izmir Cup - Doubles
2009 Türk Telecom İzmir Cup